The T-Mobile myTouch 4G is a smartphone designed and manufactured by HTC Corporation for T-Mobile USA's "myTouch" re-branded series of phones.  HTC's name for the device during development was "Glacier". This is T-Mobile's second "4G" phone, after the T-Mobile G2, and the third smartphone by T-Mobile that runs Android 2.2 Froyo software. The phone was released in black, red, and white colors.

International release 

The T-Mobile myTouch 4G was released in Canada on the Mobilicity network as the "HTC Panache 4G" with the original, unmodified HTC Sense 2.1 user interface on top of Android 2.3.3 Gingerbread and with the genius key replaced with search functionality. The HTC Panache 4G was available for $299.99 CA on the Mobilicity web site.

Features 

The myTouch 4G supports Wi-Fi, 3G UMTS and HSPA+, EDGE, and GPRS networks. The myTouch 4G is supported by T-Mobile 4G. The myTouch 4G also supports Wi-Fi Calling.

Hardware 

The T-Mobile myTouch 4G runs on a 1 GHz Qualcomm Snapdragon processor with 768MB of RAM. It has a 5.0MP camera with auto-focus and flash that also captures 720p HD-quality video. It sports a front-facing video camera for video chat and video calls, has a wireless card supporting a/b/g/n connections, and a bluetooth 2.1+EDR chip. The myTouch 4G has a lithium-ion battery that is capable of up to 10 hours of talk time and 18 days of standby time.

Screen 

The myTouch 4G has a 3.8" Super LCD display that brings along Sony's VSPEC III technology providing an 800:1 contrast ratio and a viewing angle of up to 160 degrees.

Some models of the phone have been shipped with a screen manufactured by Sharp that has a lower contrast ratio and a poorer viewing angle.

Package contents 

The T-Mobile myTouch 4G comes bundled with a pair of headphones, USB cable and documentation, all inside a unique carrying case that also serves as the retail box. The phone itself also has an 8GB SanDisk Class 4 microSD Card (SDHC) inside and is expandable up to 32GB.

Commercials 

In November 2010, T-Mobile began airing a series of popular television commercials mocking Apple's Mac vs. PC commercials by portraying the iPhone and AT&T network as "a haggard pair of piggybacking fellows" and the myTouch 4G as model Carly Foulkes.

Controversy 

As with many other Android phones, the official software updates for the phone remain controversial.  T-Mobile has officially stated that an update to Android 2.3 "Gingerbread" would be made.  In July 2011, it was revealed that an official update was finished and would be available onwards from 20 July 2011, via the means of the over-the-air programming.

However, to date, many customers have never received the update, and T-Mobile support representatives on Twitter suggested in October 2011 that the OTA update is no longer available as T-Mobile is working on further improvements before making the update available again. No clarification is ever given on the exact reasons why the update is no longer available, or why it was pulled out, or what further improvements are required to be completed before it would be available again.  Moreover, there is no option within the interface that allows you to check for updates.

Although the update is offered in some T-Mobile retail stores through an in-store microSD card update, such procedure represents a significant inconvenience to the customers, as it requires finding a T-Mobile store which offers the update, planning an hour-long visit to the store, and having a fully charged battery prior to the visit.

As such, T-Mobile users still don't have any means to perform a supported and official update from 2.2 to 2.3 at their convenience at home.

According to a Tmobile Support post on December 19, 2011, beginning December 20, 2011  T-Mobile will start an over-the-air  (OTA) update for the T-Mobile myTouch 4G.  This update  is to Android 2.3.4 / Software version 2.32.531.1. The OTA roll-out will complete by January 23, 2012. Users that have received the 2.3+ system update are able to manually check for system updates via the settings menu.

However, according to a Tmobile support post on January 25, 2012, the OTA update was "paused for customers whose devices are currently on Android 2.2. HTC has stated they paused the update to improve the update utility." These customers "[c]annot download the update manually, nor receive it as an OTA. T-Mobile does not know when the  update will resume."

Notes

References

External links 

Android (operating system) devices
HTC mobile phones
MyTouch
Mobile phones introduced in 2010
Smartphones